Ove Ingels (16 February 1926 – 1977) was a Swedish curler.

He was a 1966 Swedish men's curling champion.

In 1967 he was inducted into the Swedish Curling Hall of Fame.

He was employed as a dentist.

Teams

References

External links
 

1926 births
1977 deaths
Sportspeople from Stockholm
Swedish male curlers
Swedish curling champions
Swedish dentists
20th-century Swedish people